The Gnoll in Neath, Wales is a sports ground, with a capacity of 6,000 (formerly 15,000). It is used primarily for rugby union and rugby league, although it has also been used previously for association football and cricket. The stadium has hosted international rugby matches, with it being the home ground of the Wales women's national rugby union team, and men's matches included one during the 2013 Rugby League World Cup against the Cook Islands.

Description
In July 2009, Neath RFC presented plans for the redevelopment of the Gnoll, including building a community centre on the site, which were criticised by Neath town councillors as being "too woolly".

Rugby

Rugby union
The Gnoll is the traditional home of Neath RFC, one of the leading Welsh clubs in the pre-regional era of rugby. It has hosted Neath since the club was founded in 1871. The ground has a capacity of 6,000.

The Gnoll has been used as the home ground for the Wales women's national rugby union team, including during the 2016 Women's Six Nations Championship where it was the site of a victory over France following a try by Megan York which qualified the team for the 2017 Women's Rugby World Cup.

Rugby league

South Wales Scorpions have played at the Gnoll since their formation in 2010. The ground hosted a Wales national rugby league team match during the 2010 European Cup, where Wales defeated Ireland 31–30. It also hosted Ireland at the Gnoll in at the 2011 Rugby League Four Nations. Wales won the game by 30 points to 6. The stadium also hosted Wales v Cook Islands at the 2013 Rugby League World Cup; it was the smallest venue used at the tournament and only hosted a single game.

Association football
Welsh Premier League club Neath Athletic played at The Gnoll between 2008, and their liquidation in 2012. The ground hosted its first ever football match when Neath Athletic played Swansea City in a pre-season friendly in July 2008.

Cricket
The Gnoll started to host some Glamorgan County Championship fixtures in the 1930s, and in 1954 an indoor cricket school was opened at the site. However, problems with the pitch meant that from the late 1960s the ground was only used for one-day matches - in 1969 the Gnoll staged the county's first-ever home game in the Sunday League. In 1974, the Gnoll was dropped from the county's 1st XI fixture list, although it played host to Glamorgan's matches against the touring Australians in 1985 and 1993. Championship cricket returned to The Gnoll between 1986 and 1992 with Glamorgan staging five home games there, and one further first-class cricket game was played against a Young Australia team in 1995. Glamorgan returned to The Gnoll in August 2022, scheduling two 50-over matches in the 2022 Royal London One-Day Cup.

See also

List of rugby league stadiums by capacity

References

External links

Buildings and structures in Neath
Gnoll, The
Ospreys (rugby union)
Neath RFC
South Wales Scorpions
Gnoll, The
Gnoll, The
Stadiums in Wales
Rugby league stadiums in Wales
Rugby League World Cup stadiums
Multi-purpose stadiums in the United Kingdom
Sports venues completed in 1871